The Women's Individual Time Trial at the 1995 World Cycling Championships was held on Wednesday October 4, 1995, in Tunja / Duitama, Colombia, over a total distance of 26.1 kilometres. There were a total number of 44 competitors, with one rider who did not reach the finish line and four non-starters.

The women's individual time trial (ITT) was added to the world championships last year (1994). It replaces the team time trial.

Final classification

See also
Cycling at the 1996 Summer Olympics – Women's time trial

References
cyclingnews

Women's Time Trial
UCI Road World Championships – Women's time trial
UCI